Kingsburg is a city in Fresno County, California. The population was 12,380 at the 2020 census.

History
Kingsburg was established as a railroad town, its site set by the Central Pacific Railroad when it completed the Valley Line in 1873. In the early 1870s, Swedish natives settled in a railroad town called "Kings River Switch". Kingsburg started out as a flag stop on the Central Pacific Railroad called Kings River Switch. In 1874 Kingsburg was called Wheatville and had a post office, later that year they changed the name to Kingsbury. So it was suggested that the east side be called Drapersville and the west side called Farleyville. Two years after that it became Kingsburgh and in January 1894 took on its present spelling, "Kingsburg", which was finally established as a town in 1908. By 1921, ninety-four percent of the population within a three-mile radius of Kingsburg was Swedish-American, giving the community the nickname of "Little Sweden". To keep up with the town's Swedish history most retail businesses are designed in Swedish architecture.

Agriculture
For much of the town's history, the fields around Kingsburg were mostly grape vineyards which produce mainly raisins and table grapes; in 2002 a large surplus of raisins and grapes drove the price for these commodities down to an all-time low. Subsequently, farmers were forced to replant the fields with stone fruit, or (particularly on the west side of town) sell their land to developers to help cope with the rising population. Kingsburg was the headquarters of Sun-Maid Growers of California, a producer of raisins and other dried fruits. Fresno is the Corporate Headquarters. Kingsburg is  home to the world's largest box of raisins, built by students at California State University, Fresno.

Swedish Festival

One of the notable landmarks in the community is the Kingsburg water tower, which is shaped like an antique Swedish coffee pot.

The Swedish immigrant heritage of the community is principally preserved with festivals. The Kingsburg Swedish Festival, which is one of the biggest and best known festivals that bring people in from all over the country, is held annually during the third weekend in May. Activities include a Swedish pancake breakfast, a parade and the coronation of the Swedish Festival Queen. Many booths, rides and activities are set up all along the side of Downtown Kingsburg's Draper Street. This festival, which has traditionally been held on Friday, Saturday, and Sunday, was scheduled for only Saturday and Sunday in 2009 after the town's centennial due to the suffering economy, but in 2011, Thursday activities were added to the festival.

Geography
Kingsburg is located in the central portion of the Central Valley of California. The town is two hours away from The Sierra Nevada Mountain range and the coast. It is about 3–4 hours away from Los Angeles, San Francisco, and Sacramento.

Demographics

2010
The 2010 United States Census reported that Kingsburg had a population of 11,382. The racial makeup of Kingsburg was 8,576 (75.3%) White, 62 (0.5%) African American, 146 (1.3%) Native American, 383 (3.4%) Asian, 21 (0.2%) Pacific Islander, 1,706 (15.0%) from other races, and 488 (4.3%) from two or more races. Hispanic or Latino of any race were 4,883 persons (42.9%).

The census reported that 11,300 people (99.3% of the population) lived in households, no one lived in non-institutionalized group quarters and 82 (0.7%) were institutionalized.

There were 3,822 households, 1,671 (43.7%) had children under the age of 18 living in them, 2,287 (59.8%) were opposite-sex married couples living together, 474 (12.4%) had a female householder with no husband present, 176 (4.6%) had a male householder with no wife present.  There were 186 (4.9%) unmarried opposite-sex partnerships, and 19 (0.5%) same-sex married couples or partnerships. 770 households (20.1%) were one person and 398 (10.4%) had someone living alone who was 65 or older. The average household size was 2.96.  There were 2,937 families (76.8% of households); the average family size was 3.41.

The age distribution was 3,368 people (29.6%) under the age of 18, 1,043 people (9.2%) aged 18 to 24, 2,899 people (25.5%) aged 25 to 44, 2,618 people (23.0%) aged 45 to 64, and 1,454 people (12.8%) who were 65 or older.  The median age was 33.7 years. For every 100 females, there were 92.9 males.  For every 100 females age 18 and over, there were 89.1 males.

There were 4,069 housing units at an average density of ,of which 3,822 were occupied, 2,536 (66.4%) by the owners and 1,286 (33.6%) by renters.  The homeowner vacancy rate was 2.8%; the rental vacancy rate was 6.5%.  7,518 people (66.1% of the population) lived in owner-occupied housing units and 3,782 people (33.2%) lived in rental housing units.

2000
At the 2000 census there were 9,199 people in 3,226 households, including 2,458 families, in the city. The racial makeup of the city was 71.93% White, 0.45% Black or African American, 0.67% Native American, 2.74% Asian, 0.14% Pacific Islander, 9.61% from other races, and 4.46% from two or more races. 34.42% of the population were Hispanic or Latino of any race. 21.7% were of German, 28.6% Swedish, 9.7% English and 5.4% Irish ancestry according to Census 2000.
Of the 3,226 households 40.0% had children under the age of 18 living with them, 60.4% were married couples living together, 11.3% had a female householder with no husband present, and 23.8% were non-families. 21.3% of households were one person and 10.8% were one person aged 65 or older. The average household size was 2.82 and the average family size was 3.29.

The age distribution was 30.0% under the age of 18, 8.3% from 18 to 24, 29.0% from 25 to 44, 19.5% from 45 to 64, and 13.2% 65 or older. The median age was 34 years. For every 100 females, there were 91.6 males. For every 100 females age 18 and over, there were 87.6 males.

The median household income was $40,490 and the median family income  was $44,737. Males had a median income of $35,452 versus $23,409 for females. The per capita income for the city was $16,137. About 10.4% of families and 11.5% of the population were below the poverty line, including 16.6% of those under age 18 and 6.8% of those age 65 or over.

1920
In 1920, Armenians comprised 46% of the population of the town of Kingsburg, with 600 Armenian residents out of a total population of 1,316.

School system
Kingsburg Elementary schools operate on a charter school system.  Kingsburg's elementary school system is unique in that all students in Kindergarten through 8th grades will all go to the same schools together. The school year starts during the later weeks of August.  Washington Elementary serves as a Kindergarten only school.  First grade is at Roosevelt Elementary. Second and Third grades are at Lincoln Elementary. Fourth, Fifth, and Sixth grades are at Ronald Reagan Elementary.  Seventh and Eighth grades are at Rafer Johnson Junior High School. Kingsburg High School serves as the community high school, and its district is separate from that of the elementary school system. The elementary school district also operates Central Valley Home School which serves as a supplement to traditional home schooling.

Notable people
Tyler Bray, former quarterback for the University of Tennessee and NFL free agent quarterback
 Marcus Cabello, 2003-2008 Fresno Fuego, Professional Soccer Player 2009 USL
Monte Clark, Monte Dale Clark was born in Kingsburg and was an American football player who served as head coach for two National Football League teams: the San Francisco 49ers and the Detroit Lions
Larry Hillblom, statutory rapist and co-founder of DHL Worldwide Express
Jimmy Johnson, cornerback for the San Francisco 49ers
Rafer Johnson, Olympic gold-medal decathlete
Slim Pickens and Easy Pickens, Western film actors, born in Kingsburg
Kody Swanson, 2014, 2015 & 2017 United States Auto Club Silver Crown Series Champion

References

External links

Kingsburg Recorder Newspaper
Kingsburg High School Multi-class Reunion site
Kingsburg Joint Union High School District
Valkommem to Kingsburg "The Swedish Village"

Cities in Fresno County, California
Kings River (California)
Incorporated cities and towns in California
Swedish-American culture in California
Populated places established in 1908
1908 establishments in California